GTY could refer to:

 Gatley railway station, England, station code
 Gettysburg Regional Airport, Pennsylvania, US, IATA airport code